Angel Somov (born  in Vienna) is an Austrian bobsledder.

Somov competed at the 2014 Winter Olympics for Austria. He teamed with driver Benjamin Maier, Markus Sammer, Stefan Withalm and Sebastian Heufler in the four-man event, finishing 21st.

Somov made his World Cup debut in January 2014. As of April 2014, his best finish is 22nd, in a four-man event in 2013-14 at Konigssee.

References

1990 births
Living people
Olympic bobsledders of Austria
Sportspeople from Vienna
Bobsledders at the 2014 Winter Olympics
Austrian male bobsledders